Brisbane City may refer to:
 Brisbane, the metropolis
 City of Brisbane, the local government area at the centre of the metropolis
 Brisbane City Council, which manages the City of Brisbane
 Brisbane central business district, the central suburb of the City of Brisbane, officially called Brisbane City
 Brisbane City (rugby union), rugby union club
 Brisbane City FC, soccer club